is a Japanese sailor. She placed 20th in the women's RS:X event at the 2016 Summer Olympics.

References

1987 births
Living people
Japanese female sailors (sport)
Olympic sailors of Japan
Sailors at the 2016 Summer Olympics – RS:X
Japanese windsurfers
Female windsurfers